Grace Melzia Bumbry (born January 4, 1937), an American opera singer, is considered one of the leading mezzo-sopranos of her generation, as well as a major soprano earlier in her career. She is a member of a pioneering generation of African-American opera and classical singers, beginning with Leontyne Price and including Martina Arroyo, Shirley Verrett, Jessye Norman, Kathleen Battle, and Reri Grist, who succeeded Marian Anderson in the worlds of opera and classical music. They paved the way for future generations of African-American opera and concert singers. Bumbry's voice was rich and dynamic, possessing a wide range, and was capable of producing a very distinctive plangent tone.

In her prime, she also possessed good agility and bel canto technique (see for example her renditions of the 'Veil Song' from Verdi's Don Carlo in the 1970s and 1980s, as well as her Ernani from the Lyric Opera of Chicago in 1984). She was particularly noted for her fiery temperament and dramatic intensity on stage. More recently, she has also become known as a recitalist and interpreter of lieder, and as a teacher. From the late 1980s on, she concentrated her career in Europe, rather than in the US. A long-time resident of Switzerland, she now makes her home in Salzburg, Austria.

Early life and career
Grace Bumbry was born in St. Louis, Missouri, the third child of Benjamin and Melzia Bumbry.  They were a family of modest means, deeply religious and highly musical.  In a BBC radio interview she recalled that her father was a railroad porter and her mother a school teacher.  She graduated from the prestigious Charles Sumner High School, the first black high school west of the Mississippi. She later credited Kenneth Billups, her voice teacher at Sumner (together with Armand Tokatyan of Santa Barbara) for her "vocal prowess."  At age 17, at the urging of Billups and Sara Hopes, her choir director, she entered and won a teen talent contest sponsored by St. Louis radio station KMOX. Prizes for first place included a $1000 war bond, a trip to New York, and a scholarship to the St. Louis Institute of Music; however, the institution would not accept her because she was black.  Embarrassed, the contest promoters arranged for her to appear on Arthur Godfrey's nationally televised Talent Scouts program, singing Verdi's aria "O don fatale" from Don Carlos. The success of that performance led to an opportunity to study at Boston University College of Fine Arts.  She later transferred to Northwestern University, where she met the German dramatic soprano and noted Wagnerian singer Lotte Lehmann, with whom she later studied at the Music Academy of the West in Santa Barbara, California, and who became her mentor in her early career. She also studied with renowned teachers Marinka Gurewich and Armand Tokatyan.  In 1958, she was a joint winner of the Metropolitan Opera National Council Auditions with soprano Martina Arroyo; later that year, she made her recital debut in Paris. Bumbry made her operatic debut in 1960 when she sang Amneris at the Paris Opéra; that same year she joined the Basel Opera.

She gained international renown when she was cast by Wieland Wagner (Richard Wagner's grandson) as Venus in Tannhäuser at Bayreuth in 1961, at age 24, the first black singer to appear there, which earned her the title "Black Venus".  The cast also included Victoria de los Angeles as Elisabeth and Wolfgang Windgassen as Tannhäuser.  Conservative opera-goers were outraged at the idea, but Bumbry's performance was so moving that by the end of the opera she had won the audience over and they applauded for 30 minutes, necessitating 42 curtain calls. The ensuing furor in the media made Bumbry an international cause célèbre.  She was subsequently invited by Jacqueline Kennedy to sing at the White House.  (She returned to the White House in 1981, singing at the Ronald Reagan inauguration.)  Having begun her operatic career on such a high note, she achieved the rare feat of never falling back on small or comprimario roles.

Bumbry made her Royal Opera House, Covent Garden debut in 1963, her La Scala debut in 1964, and her Metropolitan Opera debut in 1965 as Princess Eboli in Verdi's Don Carlo.  In 1964, Bumbry appeared for the first time as a soprano, singing Verdi's Lady Macbeth in her debut at the Vienna State Opera.  In 1966 she appeared as Carmen opposite Jon Vickers's Don José in two different lauded productions, one with conductor Herbert von Karajan in Salzburg and the other for Bumbry's debut with the San Francisco Opera. In 1967 she sang Carmen again in her debut with the Philadelphia Lyric Opera Company and returned to the San Francisco Opera in 1967 for her first performance of Laura Adorno in La Gioconda with Leyla Gencer as Gioconda, Renato Cioni as Enzo Grimaldi, Maureen Forrester as La Cieca and Chester Ludgin as Barnaba.

In 1963, she married the Polish-born tenor Erwin Jaeckel. They divorced in 1972.

Later career
In the 1970s, Bumbry, having recorded many soprano arias, began taking on more soprano roles.  Her first official soprano role was Salome in 1970 at Covent Garden. In 1971, she debuted as Tosca at the Metropolitan Opera. She also took on more unusual roles, such as Janáček's Jenůfa (in Italian) at La Scala in 1974 (with Magda Olivero as the Kostelnička), Dukas's Ariane et Barbe-bleue in Paris in 1975, and Sélika in Meyerbeer's L'Africaine at Covent Garden in 1978 (opposite Plácido Domingo as Vasco da Gama). She also began assuming such roles as Norma, Medea, Abigaille and Gioconda.  She first sang Norma in 1977 in Martina Franca, Italy; the following year, she sang both Norma and Adalgisa in the same production at Covent Garden, first as the younger priestess opposite Montserrat Caballé as Norma; later, as Norma, with Josephine Veasey as Adalgisa.

As an interpreter of lieder she often performed with the German pianist Sebastian Peschko.

Other noted soprano roles in her career have included: Chimène (in Le Cid), Elisabeth (in Tannhäuser), Elvira (in Ernani), Leonora (both Il trovatore and La forza del destino). Other major mezzo-soprano roles in her repertory included Dalila, Cassandre and Didon (in Les Troyens), Massenet's Hérodiade, Ulrica, Azucena, Gluck's Orfeo and Telemaco.

In the 1990s, she also founded and toured with the Grace Bumbry Black Musical Heritage Ensemble, a group devoted to preserving and performing traditional Negro spirituals. Her last operatic appearance was as Klytämnestra in Richard Strauss's Elektra in Lyon in 1997.  She has since devoted herself to teaching and judging international competitions and to the concert stage, giving a series of recitals in 2001 and 2002 in honor of her teacher, Lotte Lehmann, including in Paris (Théâtre du Châtelet), London (Wigmore Hall) and New York (Alice Tully Hall).

In 2010, after an absence of many years from the opera stage, she performed in Scott Joplin's Treemonisha at the Theatre du Chatelet in Paris, and in 2013, she returned to the Vienna State Opera as the Countess in Tchaikovsky's The Queen of Spades.

Her advice to young singers is: "To strive for excellence, that's the answer. If you strive for excellence, that means that you are determined. You will find a way to get to your goal, even if it means having to turn down some really great offers. You have to live with that, as you have to live with yourself."

Vocal range
Bumbry's career in the world of opera was a remarkable and long one, if somewhat controversial.  Initially, Bumbry began her career as a mezzo-soprano, but later expanded her repertoire to include many dramatic soprano roles.  In the mid-1970s and 1980s she considered herself a soprano; but in the 1990s, as her career approached its twilight, she often returned to mezzo roles.   She was one of the more successful singers who have made the transition from mezzo-soprano to high soprano (along with her compatriot and contemporary Shirley Verrett); however, audiences and critics were divided over whether she was a "true" soprano.  Nonetheless, she sang major soprano roles at most major opera houses around the world up until the end of her operatic career in the 1990s—singing Turandot at the Royal Opera House at Covent Garden (London) in 1993, for example.  Her main operatic career spanned from 1960 (her debut in Paris as Amneris) to 1997 (as Klytämnestra, in Lyon, France), though she resumed staged activity years later .

Recordings and honors
Much of her recorded legacy is from her mezzo period, including at least two Carmens and three Amnerises (possibly her most frequently performed role onstage and most frequently recorded), Venus (with Anja Silja as Elisabeth, at the 1962 Bayreuth Festival), Eboli and Orfeo, and Verdi's Messa da Requiem at Royal Festival Hall in April 1964. There are no commercially released complete studio opera recordings with her in a soprano role, but there are recordings of live performances of Le Cid (with the Opera Orchestra of New York), Jenůfa (at La Scala) and Norma (Martina Franca), in addition to some commercial compilations that include arias in the soprano repertoire. Many of these were recorded in her "mezzo period", in the 1960s (including excerpts of La forza del destino in German, with Bumbry as Leonora and Nicolai Gedda as Alvaro). She also recorded music for the musical Carmen Jones, based on the Bizet opera; as well as operetta (Johan Strauss II's Der Zigeunerbaron), oratorio (Handel's Israel in Egypt and Judas Maccabeus), and an album of pop songs.

Bumbry has been inducted into the St. Louis Walk of Fame. Among other honors, she was bestowed the UNESCO Award, the Distinguished Alumna Award from the Academy of Music of the West, Italy's Premio Giuseppe Verdi, and was named Commandeur des Arts et Lettres by the French government. She received a Grammy Award in 1972 for Best Opera Recording. On December 6, 2009, she was among those honored with the 2009 Kennedy Center Honors, for her contribution to the performing arts.

On December 5, 2021, she paid tribute to her Operatic friend Justino Diaz who was one of the five people being honored that night for the 2021 Kennedy Center Honors.

Videography
 The Metropolitan Opera Centennial Gala (1983), Deutsche Grammophon/PolyGram, 073 453
 James Levine's 25th Anniversary Metropolitan Opera Gala (1996), Deutsche Grammophon/Universal Classics, B0004602

References

Further reading
 Hamilton, David. (1987). The Metropolitan Opera Encyclopedia: A Comprehensive Guide to the World of Opera. New York, London, Toronto, Sydney, Tokyo: Simon and Schuster. pp. 58–59. .
 Hamilton, Mary. (1990). A–Z of Opera. New York, Oxford, Sydney: Facts On File. p. 38. .
 Nash, Elizabeth, Autobiographical Reminiscences of African-American Classical Singers, 1853–present, Edwin Mellen Press, 2007. 
 Rosenthal, Harold and John Warrack. (1979, 2nd ed.). The Concise Oxford Dictionary of Opera. London, New York and Melbourne: Oxford University Press. p. 70. .
 Sadie, Stanley and Christina Bashford. (1992). The New Grove Dictionary of Opera. London: Macmillan Publishers Ltd. Vol. 1, p. 639. .
 Sadie, Stanley and John Tyrrell. (2001). The New Grove Dictionary of Music and Musicians. London: Macmillan Publishers Ltd. Vol. 4, pp. 601–02. .
 Warrack, John and Ewan West. (1996 3rd ed.). The Concise Oxford Dictionary of Opera. New York: Oxford University Press. p. 69.

External links

1937 births
Living people
American operatic sopranos
American operatic mezzo-sopranos
Boston University College of Fine Arts alumni
Bienen School of Music alumni
Deutsche Grammophon artists
Music Academy of the West alumni
Kennedy Center honorees
Musicians from St. Louis
Sumner High School (St. Louis) alumni
Winners of the Metropolitan Opera National Council Auditions
Singers from Missouri
20th-century African-American women singers
20th-century American women opera singers
African-American women opera singers
Commandeurs of the Ordre des Arts et des Lettres
21st-century African-American women singers
21st-century American women opera singers